Dinopithecus ("terrible ape") is an extinct genus of very large primate closely related to the baboon that lived during the Pliocene to the Pleistocene epoch of South Africa and Ethiopia. It was named by British paleontologist Robert Broom in 1937. The only species currently recognized is Dinopithecus ingens, as D. quadratirostris has been reassigned to the genus Soromandrillus. It is known from several infilled cave sites in South Africa, all of early Pleistocene age, including Skurweberg, Swartkrans (Member 1), and Sterkfontein (Member 4 or 5, but probably member 4).

Description 
Dinopithecus ingens was approximately twice the size of the largest living baboons, with males averaging  and females , based on estimates from the molar teeth. The most distinguishing feature of the genus is its large size in comparison to other papionins. The only other papionin species to attain a similar size were Theropithecus brumpti and Theropithecus oswaldi. These, however, are very different from Dinopithecus in their dental morphology. Overall, the skull is similar to that of modern baboons, except that it generally lacks the facial fossae (depressions on the sides of the muzzle and lower jaw) and maxillary ridges (ridges of bone that run along the upper sides of the snout). For these reasons, Dinopithecus is sometimes treated as a subgenus of Papio.

Paleoecology 
Most living papionins are omnivorous feeders that consume a wide range of readily digestible plant parts, especially fruits, as well as insects and other invertebrates, and small vertebrates. An analysis of the carbon isotopes from samples of its tooth enamel found Dinopithecus to consume the smallest portion of grass and other savanna-based foods of any South African primate. Analysis of the microwear patterns on the molar teeth showed that they were similar to those of the living yellow baboon (Papio cynocephalus), suggesting a broad and eclectic diet. A study of the adaptations of the molar teeth suggested that D. ingens ate a very high percentage of fruit and relatively few leaves.

No bones of the limbs or other parts beyond the skulls and teeth have been attributed to Dinopithecus, so it is impossible to know its mode of locomotion for certain. However, as a papionin of very large size, it most probably spent a significant amount of time on the ground and moved quadrupedally.

References

Pliocene primates
Pliocene mammals of Africa
Pleistocene primates
Pleistocene mammals of Africa
Prehistoric monkeys
Prehistoric primate genera
Taxa named by Robert Broom
Fossil taxa described in 1937